The Anglican Diocese of Adelaide is a diocese of the Anglican Church of Australia. It is centred in the city of Adelaide in the state of South Australia and extends along the eastern shore of the Gulf St Vincent from the town of Eudunda in the north to Aldgate in the south. The diocesan cathedral is Saint Peter's Cathedral in Adelaide. The diocese was founded in 1847 with Augustus Short as the first bishop. The incumbent Archbishop of Adelaide since 2017 has been Geoffrey Smith, who has also been the Anglican Primate of Australia since 2020.

History
The diocese was founded by letters patent of 25 June 1847 and now forms part of the Province of South Australia, together with the Diocese of Willochra (1915) and the Diocese of The Murray (1969). Since 1970, the Bishop of Adelaide, as the senior bishop of the province (known as the metropolitan), has borne the title of archbishop.

The Most Reverend Jeffrey Driver retired as Archbishop of Adelaide in 2016. Following a process of nomination, an election synod held in December 2016 resolved to invite Geoffrey Smith, then an assistant bishop in the Diocese of Brisbane, to be the 10th Archbishop of Adelaide. He was installed on 28 April 2017. On 7 April 2020, Smith was elected as the Primate of Australia, the first Archbishop of Adelaide to hold the office.

List of bishops and archbishops of Adelaide

Assistant bishops
John Vockler was consecrated coadjutor bishop in 1959. Lionel Renfrey was an assistant bishop of the diocese in 1988.

The current assistant bishops in the diocese are:
Tim Harris - ordained (consecrated) as an assistant bishop and Bishop for Mission and Evangelism in 2011 and became bishop administrator during the 2016–2017 vacancy in the see.
Chris McLeod - ordained (consecrated) on 11 April 2015 as assistant bishop with special responsibility for ministry alongside Aboriginal people in South Australia and National Aboriginal Bishop. Appointed Dean of St Peter's Cathedral in 2021.
Denise Ferguson - consecrated assistant bishop in July 2019, with responsibility for multicultural diversity in ministry, healthcare chaplaincies – covering both hospital and social service based care contexts – and ministry formation.

List of archdeacons
In 1866, there was one archdeaconry: W. J. Woodcock was Archdeacon of Adelaide.

References

External links 

Adelaide
Organisations based in Adelaide
1847 establishments in Australia
Anglican Church of Australia Ecclesiastical Province of South Australia